Knud Pedersen (26 December 1925, in Grenaa – 18 December 2014, in Gentofte) was a Danish artist and resistance leader. His career as a public figure started in 1942, when he, together with seven other young Danes, founded the resistance group Churchill Klubben (The Churchill Club). After the war, he worked briefly as a newspaper reporter, attended law school, and worked for a film company before devoting his life to art.

Knud Pederson was a resistance fighter during World War II. Angered that the Danish government had let the Nazis invade without the Danish army putting up a fight,  a group of Danish teenage boys and he started the Churchill Club, named after British leader Winston Churchill. The Churchill Club sabotaged cars and train stations, and stole many weapons and explosives from the Nazis. Knud was arrested and tried for sabotage, stealing, destruction of property, and other offences. He was arrested and put in prison for two years. The first year, he was in a city prison, called King Hans Gades Jail, and then was moved to Nyborg State Prison. The resistance refused him, since the Nazis were watching him, and he could easily be identified on covert missions. Eventually, he joined K company, division B, group number 4. They moved weapons caches from place to place to avoid German detection.

Post-war activities
After many a sabotage actions and 2 years in prison, Pedersen turned to the arts, partly as an artist, but mainly as an organizer. Before he became a saboteur, he loved painting. His father supported him so much that he opened an account for him at a local art store, allowing him to buy any supplies that he desired. His dream was to make art available to everyone, and to this end, he launched several projects. In 1943, he got permission from the authorities to set up Byens billede, the Picture of the City, an empty frame in which paintings could be exhibited. In 1945, he founded his Kunstbibliotek, or Art Library, an art rental space where people could rent a painting for the price of a packet of cigarettes. Both projects still exist; passers-by will meet the Picture of the City on Nikolaj Kirke Plads in Copenhagen.

As a young bohemian in Copenhagen in the late 1950s and early 1960s, Pedersen got to know a great many local artists. Among them was Arthur Köpcke or Køpcke, a German national who had emigrated to Denmark in 1958. Køpcke ran a small gallery, Galerie Køpcke, that showed some of the most advanced art in Europe at that time. Besides works by local artists, he exhibited works by Piero Manzoni, Christian Megert, Diter Rot, Robert Filliou, Niki de Saint Phalle, and Daniel Spoerri. Via Rot, Filliou, and Spoerri, he also came into contact with George Maciunas, the man who invented the name Fluxus. He offered to organize a Fluxus concert in Copenhagen, and Maciunas agreed.

By that time, Køpcke had had to leave his old gallery space and had been given shelter by Pedersen at Nikolaj Kirke, today Kunsthallen Nikolaj, the old desanctified church in the center of Copenhagen where the Art Library was located. It was only natural that Pedersen should take an interest, and the result was that the first series of Fluxus concerts ever to be held in Denmark – the second series of concerts in the history of Fluxus – took place at Nikolaj Kirke from 23 until 28 November 1962. Pedersen enjoyed the experience and continued to organize Fluxus concerts at the Art Library. The concerts in November 1962 brought together a group of four, consisting of Pedersen, Køpcke, and two young Danish composers called Eric Andersen  and Henning Christiansen, who enlivened Danish art life with numerous Fluxus performances in 1963 and 1964, many of them organized by Pedersen.

Pedersen, however, always continued working with other artists, besides the ones who were associated with Fluxus. In 1964, he made an agreement with the Tuborg brewery, to the effect that works of art could be displayed on the sides of beer vans as they drove their delivery rounds through the country. At the Art Library, he installed a jukebox with works of sound art, and offered to rent jukeboxes to every institution that was interested. In 1968, he opened a savings account at a special interest rate at the Danish Bikuben bank and deposited 100 Danish crowns. In 285 years, the 100 crowns would grow to 659 billion crowns, enough money to finance three projects by Fluxus artists Eric Andersen, George Brecht, and Arthur Køpcke.

From being an organizer, though, Pedersen developed to become an artist, as well. This development was only natural, since so much Fluxus art is about creating a framework within which the art can develop. In retrospect, even his earliest projects, such as the Picture of the City, can be seen as a kind of work of art. In 1967, he opened the Copenhagen Museum of Modern Art, a virtual museum, where he is still the director, receiving daily invitations and publications from other museums. In connection with the "Fluxshoe"
 exhibition that toured England during the early 1970s, he organized a "two-ball football match" at University College Sports Ground for the Museum of Modern Art, Oxford. In 1992, in connection with a festival called “Excellent 1992”, he created the Good Buy Supermarket, a one-day sale of art multiples at a regular supermarket. And on the same occasion, he organized “Three Star à la Carte”, where Fluxus pieces were served in a restaurant setting. A new realization of the piece could be experienced at the Baltic Centre in Gateshead on 15 February 2009, in connection with the exhibition ;;George Maciunas: The Dream of Fluxus]The projects mentioned above represent only a fraction of Pedersen's total production. Apart from having run the Art Library for a lifetime, he is a prolific writer and initiator of many projects. He founded the European Film College  Ebeltoft, founded Netbogklubben, the NetBook Club, for the sale of digital books, and much more. During the 1960s, '70s, and '80s, he was an active participant in the mail art network, exchanging works of art with hundreds of artists around the globe. Today, these works, together with a great number of Fluxus works and related documents, make up the bulk of the Knud Pedersen Fluxus Archive, located at Kunsthallen Nikolaj in Copenhagen. The name "archive" is misleading, though; rather than a systematic collection of material, the archive is the witness of a long life spent making and distributing art.

As Pedersen himself has said: "I do not collect, I just never throw anything away". He died at the age of 88 on 18 December 2014.

See alsoThe Boys who Challenged Hitler''

References

Peter van der Meijden, art historian, January 2009.

External links
Copenhagen Fluxus Archive, The Knud Pedersen Collection. Retrieved 19 September 2009.
Kunstbiblioteket.
Copenhagen Museum og Modern Art.
Three Star a La Carte
The Museum is closed.  exhibition at Kunsthallen Nikolaj 2015.

Danish artists
Danish resistance members
2014 deaths
1925 births
Fluxus
Danish conceptual artists